= Alvin Purple (band) =

- Origin: York and Leeds, Yorkshire, England
- Genres: Alternative rock, indie rock
- Years active: 2008–present
- Members: Carly Humphries; Luke Barnfather; Matthew Bradley; Ralph Sayers
- Website: www.alvinpurple.co.uk

Alvin Purple are an English indie rock band based in York and Leeds, England. The band currently consists of Carly Humphries (vocals), Luke Barnfather (guitar), Ralph Sayers (bass guitar) and Matthew Bradley (drums). The band are known for their live performances, they have toured the UK and played a number of UK festivals.

The band have performed live sessions for BBC Introducing and have had airplay on BBC 6 Music. The band released a debut double A-side single in Spring 2010 ("The Look" / "Stare to Declare"). Both songs were featured in the BBC1 programme Waterloo Road The band have collaborated with Craig Goode and Andy Little to make a number of videos. The band have been working with producer James Kenosha, they have confirmed that they will release "Huh Her" 23 January 2012.

== Discography ==
=== Singles ===
- "The Look" / "Stare to Declare" (March 2010)
- "Huh Her" (January 2012)
